Romulus is the world's tallest living donkey, as certified by the Guinness World Records. He is just over 2 2/3 times as tall as KneeHi, the Guinness World Record holder for shortest donkey. He is owned by Phil and Cara Barker Yellott of Adrian, Michigan. Romulus is an American Mammoth Jackstock gelding. Romulus has a brother Remus, who is just  shorter.

Overview 
Romulus and Remus are American Mammoth Jackstock donkeys, the world's largest donkey breed. American mammoths were developed and utilized for their potential to produce large mules when cross-bred with horses.

Guinness World Record 
On February 8, 2013, Romulus was measured for the Guinness Book of World Records.  His paperwork was received in London and certified by Guinness World Records on May 13, 2013.

See also

References

External links
 

2004 animal births
Individual donkeys
Individual animals in the United States